Zuccarinia is a monotypic genus of flowering plants in the family of Rubiaceae. The genus contains only one species, i.e. Zuccarinia macrophylla, which is endemic to western Malesia, It is found in Jawa, Malaya and Sumatera.

The genus and species were circumscribed by Carl Ludwig Blume in Bijdr. Fl. Ned. Ind. on pages 1006-1007 in 1826.

The genus name of Zuccarinia is in honour of Joseph Gerhard Zuccarini (1797–1848), who was a German botanist, Professor of Botany at the University of Munich.

Former species
 Zuccarinia cordata Ridl. = Zuccarinia macrophylla Blume
 Zuccarinia ornata (Wall.) Spreng. = Jackiopsis ornata (Wall.) Ridsdale

References

External links
World Checklist of Rubiaceae

Monotypic Rubiaceae genera
Octotropideae
Flora of Java
Flora of Malaya
Flora of Sumatra